Udara dilectissima is a species of butterfly of the family Lycaenidae. It is found in South-east Asia.

Subspecies
Udara dilectissima dilectissima (Borneo)
Udara dilectissima luzona Eliot and Kawazoé, 1983 (Philippines: Luzon)

References

 , 1983. Blue butterflies of the Lycaenopsis group: 1-309, 6 pls. London

Butterflies described in 1895
Udara
Butterflies of Borneo
Butterflies of Asia